Cho-airong (Pattani Malay: แชย็อง) is a district (amphoe) of Narathiwat province, southern Thailand.

History
Cho-airong was made a minor district (king amphoe) on 31 May 1993, by separating three tambons from Ra-ngae district. On 5 December 1996 it was upgraded to a full district.

Geography
Neighboring districts are (from the north clockwise): Mueang Narathiwat, Tak Bai, Su-ngai Padi and Ra-ngae.

Administration

Central administration 
Cho-airong is divided into three sub-districts (tambons), which are further subdivided into 33 administrative villages (mubans).

Local administration 
There are three sub-district administrative organizations (SAO) in the district:
 Chuap consisting of sub-district Chuap.
 Bukit consisting of sub-district Bukit.
 Maruebo Ok consisting of sub-district Maruebo Ok.

References

External links
amphoe.com

Districts of Narathiwat province